Pearl of Africa Star Search Season 1 is the first season of the Ugandan reality TV show.     It was broadcast on NBS Television from 15 May 2021 to 8 August 2021 and was sponsored by The Pearl of Africa Star Search  MTN, Coca-Cola Uganda, NBS TV, Talent Africa, Radiant, 
Graphic Systems, House of DJs, Uganda Talent Management Association, TAG Studios, Uganda 
Musicians Association and Uganda Tourism Board.   The winner earned a grand prize 
package worth UGX 60,000,000 including a cash prize, recording contract from TAG studios, Professional artist management and PR, collaborations, destination trips and the paid role of Tourism Ambassador. It was won by Sandra Nansambu.

Judges
 Joanita Kawalya
 Navio
 Cindy Sanyu
 Bismark  Amumpire

Jury Members
 Abby Mukiibi Nkaaga
 Moses Matovu
 Lydia Jazmine
 Suzan Kerunen
 Spice Diana

Voice coach
 John Kay the writer

Auditions

Preliminary auditions
The competition has two rounds of auditions. The first round was an open call for virtual auditions that attracted 2000 submissions from all over the country sent via the website and Whatsapp number.

Studio auditions
The Studio auditions were second round of auditions and were physically held at Talent Africa Group's studios, giving the 50 selected contestants the opportunity to show the judges.
Contestants are grouped into huddles of 5 each, the 20 contestants have started the regional retreats from which 8 contestants(2 per region) will be dropped, leaving 12 who'll make it to the bootcamp.

Episodes

Season 1 (2021)

Contestants
The following were the nominated contestants from each region/provinces.

Finalists
The finalists were; Agami Tonny, Nansambu Sandra, Bruce Dickson, Balunywa Ibrahim, Mirembe Tracy and Yesuanjagala Carsteen.
All the 5  finalists got recording deals  as well as booking at TAG Studios but Sandra Nansambu got full management as the overall winner.

Awards
Sandra Nansambu was crowned as the winner of the grand cash prize worth  Sixty Million Ugandan Shillings, a recording contract, music video production, professional talent management, collaborations with famous artists and destination trips

References

External links
Pearl of Africa Star Search contestants beg Ugandans for votes | Kampala Sun
Talent Africa, Minister Kiwanda launch Pearl of Africa star search
Pearl of Africa Star Search contest Grand Prize unveiled - MUGIBSON WRITES
Talent Africa Launches new campaign "Pearl of Africa Star Search"

2021 Ugandan television series debuts
Ugandan reality television series
NBS Television (Uganda) original programming